The Case of the Toxic Spell Dump is a fantasy novel by American writer Harry Turtledove, published by Baen Books in 1993.

Premise and setting
While having some aspects of an alternate history, it is mainly a work of science fantasy depicting a world where spells, pragmatically used by some to achieve the same results as the use of technology, call upon a spectrum of major to minor deities of the present to the past that are functioning when called upon or omni-present and restricted to local use or having a greater area of influence. Spells are not toxin-free and can have an ill effect on the environment when the appropriate deities and if certain practices are not considered, disaster can follow.

The book is set in a recognizable present-day United States (specifically, in a very recognizable analogue of Los Angeles), with many present-day technologies and institutions having a magical equivalent (for example, the analogue of the CIA is staffed by actual, literal spooks, and computers use a multitude of imps instead of microchips). The title refers to magic spells that can have toxic side-effects, much the same as industrial practices in our world; therefore, there is the need for a place where those toxins can be dumped to avoid damaging the environment.

The book also employs many of the conventions of the hard-boiled detective novel, transposed to this setting. The protagonist, EPA (Environmental Perfection Agency) agent David Fisher, is assigned a case that would appear to need little attention and a simple solution soon becomes complicated and dangerous.

See also
 Magic, Inc. - a similar fantasy world by Robert Heinlein
 Operation Chaos/Operation Luna  - a similar fantasy world by Poul Anderson

References

External links
 
 Review by Doug Linger
 Review on the Baen Books website
 Review by Jeph Gord
 Online sample

American fantasy novels
Novels by Harry Turtledove
American detective novels
1993 American novels
Occult detective fiction
Mythology in popular culture
Novels set in Los Angeles
Native American mythology in popular culture
Central Intelligence Agency in fiction
Mesoamerican mythology in popular culture
Science fantasy novels